American mythology is the body of traditional stories pertaining to America's most legendary stories and folktale, dating back to the late 1700s when the first colonists settled. "American mythology" may also refer to the modern study of these representations, and to the subject matter as represented in the literature and art of other cultures in any period.

Stories from American mythology are the primary sources of inspiration for stories and tall tales such as Bigfoot, Paul Bunyan, and The Lone Ranger.

Native American Buffalo
Native American culture is very much involved with mythology. They used mythology to tell great stories about their lives and the lives of their ancestors. They also would use stories to explain the supernatural connection between humans and certain animals. One very important aspect of the Native American mythology was the buffalo, also known as the Bison. The buffalo was seen as a potential food source to the Native Americans but were too hard to hunt especially before the invention of guns so instead they were used in many rituals that included dancing and prayer. Most of the rituals were related to the difficulty of the catching and the killing of the buffalo.

The buffalo were considered to be sacred animals with knowledge about medicine, they were also seen as very powerful within the spirit world. Their body parts were used in many important religious rituals.

References

American folklore
Mythology by country
North American mythology